Peak House may refer to:

England
Peak House, Sidmouth

United States
Peak House (Bedford, Kentucky), listed on the National Register of Historic Places (NRHP) in Trimble County
Peak House (Medfield, Massachusetts), NRHP-listed